Gharm-Chashma is a hot spring in the mountains of the Ishkoshim Range in Tajikistan's Gorno-Badakhshan Autonomous Province. Forty kilometres from the provincial capital Khorugh, the spring reaches temperatures as high as 50–75 °C, with water bubbling and gushing in micro-geysers to a height of 1 metre.

Season of warm mineral water On the west side of the Shahdary Ridge, in the typical watercourse of Garm-Chashma River, Garma-Chashma (Hot spring) is situated 2,325 m above sea level. The spring age is over a million millennia. On the floor, the mineral water grows in the shape of tiny and wide jets from 10 cm to 1.5 m from large depths. One jet has a second between 5 and 7 litres. The water is murky and contains calcium balls from limy soils.

References

Hot springs of Tajikistan